Bernardo Sorj (born September 1948, Montevideo, Uruguay) is a Brazilian social scientist, retired professor of Sociology at the Federal University of Rio de Janeiro. He is Director of The Edelstein Center for Social Research and of the Plataforma Democrática  Project.  He has published 30 books and more than 100 articles, on Latin American political development, international relations, the social impact of new technologies, social theory and Judaism.

Biography 

Sorj begun his studies in Social Sciences in Uruguay and completed his B.A. and M.A. in History and Sociology from the University of Haifa, Israel, and received his Ph.D. in Sociology from the University of Manchester in England.

He is a naturalized Brazilian, living in Brazil since 1976 . He was professor at the Department of Political Science at the Federal University of Minas Gerais and at the Institute for International Relations - Pontifical Catholic University of Rio de Janeiro and visiting professor and chair at many European and North American universities, including the Chaire Sérgio Buarque de Hollanda, at the Fondation Maison des sciences de l’homme, in Paris,  and the Cátedra Simón Bolívar of the Institut des hautes études d'Amérique Latine - University of Paris III: Sorbonne Nouvelle.

He is member of the board of several academic journals, advisor to scientific institutions and consultant to international organizations. He is also the coordinator of SciELO Latin American Social Sciences Journals English Edition, a site offering free access to 30 Latin American journals translated into English.  In 2005 he was elected Brazil's Man of Ideas.

Books

2022
SORJ, B. Identidades e crises das democracias São Paulo: Plataforma Democrática. 
SORJ, B. Religião, democracia e educação no Brasil São Paulo: Plataforma Democrática. 
 SORJ, B. Religião e democracia na Europa e no Brasil São Paulo: Plataforma Democrática. 

2020

 SORJ, B. Em que mundo vivemos? São Paulo: Plataforma Democrática. 
SORJ, B. ¿En qué mundo vivimos? São Paulo: Plataforma Democrática. 
SORJ, B. What world is this we are living in? São Paulo: Plataforma Democrática. 
SORJ, B. Corações e Mentes: fora e dentro da Internet. São Paulo: Plataforma Democrática. 

2018

 SORJ, B. et al., Sobrevivendo nas Redes -  Guia do Cidadão. São Paulo: Editora Moderna.

2016
 SORJ, B.; FAUSTO, S. Activismo político en tiempos de Internet. São Paulo: Plataforma Democrática.

2015
 SORJ, B.,  TONELLO, G.,  VINTIMILLA, E.,  BELLETTINI, O., TORO, B., Sociedad, organizaciones y Estado: reflexiones y experiencias para un debate necesario. Quito: Grupo Faro.
 SORJ, B., FAUSTO, S., Internet y Transformaciones Sociales: Transformaciones del Espacio Público y de la Sociedad Civil.  San Pablo: Plataforma Democrática.
 SORJ, B., FAUSTO, S., Internet e Mobilizações Sociais: Transformações do Espaço Público e da Sociedade Civil. São Paulo: Plataforma Democrática.

2014
 SORJ, B., MARTUCCELLI, O. O dilema Latino-americano (in Ukrainian ). Kiev: Calvaria.

2013
 SORJ, B.; FAUSTO, S. (Orgs.). O Brasil e a Governança da América Latina. Que tipo de liderança é possível?. São Paulo. Plataforma Democrática.
 SORJ, B., FAUSTO, S. (orgs.),  Brasil y América Latina: ¿Qué Liderazgo es Posible?. São Paulo: Plataforma Democrática.

2012
 SORJ, B. Vai embora da casa de teus pais. Rio de Janeiro: Civilização Brasileira.
 SORJ, B. (Ed.). Democracia y medios de comunicación. Más allá del Estado y el Mercado. Buenos Aires: Catálogos S.L.R.

2011
 SORJ, B.; FAUSTO, S. (Orgs.) Brasil e América do Sul: Olhares cruzados. Rio de Janeiro: Plataforma Democrática.
 SORJ, B. (Org.) Meios de comunicação e democracia: Além do Estado e do Mercado. Rio de Janeiro: Plataforma Democrática.
 SORJ, B.; FAUSTO, S. (Eds.). América Latina: Transformaciones geopolíticas y democracia. Buenos Aires: Siglo XXI.
 SORJ, B.; FAUSTO, S. (Eds.). Brasil y América del Sur: Miradas cruzadas. Buenos Aires: Catálogos S.L.R.

2010
 SORJ, B. Judaism for Everyone...without Dogma. Washington, D.C.: IFSHJ.
 SORJ, B. (comp.). Poder político y medios de comunicación - De la representación política al reality show. Buenos Aires: Siglo XXI.
 SORJ, B. (org.). Poder político e meios de comunicação: da representação política ao reality show. São Paulo: Paz e Terra.
 SORJ, B. Judaísmo para todos. Rio de Janeiro: Civilização Brasileira.
 SORJ, B. Judaísmo para todos. Lisboa: Edições Cotovia.
 SORJ, B. (org.) Usos, abusos y desafíos de la sociedad civil en América Latina. Buenos Aires: Siglo XXI.
 SORJ, B. (org.). Usos, abusos e desafios da sociedade civil na América Latina. São Paulo: Paz e Terra.

2009
 SORJ, B. Judaísmo para todos. Buenos Aires: Siglo XXI. Republished by The Edelstein Center for Social Research at 2011.

2008
 SORJ, B. Information Societies and Digital Divides: an Introduction. Milano: Polimetrica
 SORJ, B; MARTUCCELLI, D. The Latin American Challenge: Social Cohesion and Democracy. São Paulo: Instituto Fernando Henrique Cardoso/ Rio de Janeiro: The Edelstein Center for Social Research
 SORJ, B; MARTUCCELLI, D. El Desafío Latinoamericano: cohesión social y democracia. Buenos Aires: Siglo XXI.
 SORJ, B; MARTUCCELLI, D. O desafio latino-americano: coesão social e democracia. Rio de Janeiro: Civilização Brasileira.

2007
 SORJ, B. Latin America’s Elusive Democracies. Rio de Janeiro: The Edelstein Center for Social Research, E-book Series 2..
 SORJ, B. ; OLIVEIRA, M. D. (Eds.). Sociedad Civil y Democracia en América Latina: crisis y reinvención de la política. Rio de Janeiro: Ediciones Centro Edelstein; São Paulo: Ediciones iFHC. 
 SORJ, B; OLIVEIRA, M. D. (Eds.). Sociedade Civil e Democracia na América Latina: crise e reinvenção da política. Rio de Janeiro: Ediciones Centro Edelstein / São Paulo: Instituto Fernando Henrique Cardoso

2006
 SORJ, B., BONDER, N. Judaísmo para el Siglo XXI - El Rabino y el Sociólogo. Buenos Aires. Lilmod. . Republished by The Edelstein Center for Social Research at 2008.

2005
 SORJ, B., La democracia inesperada. Preface by Guillermo O'Donnell. Buenos Aires: Bononiae University Press/Prometeo Libros. . Republished by The Edelstein Center for Social Research at 2008.
 SORJ, B., GUEDES, L.E., Internet na favela. Rio de Janeiro: Unesco - Editora Gramma. 
 SORJ, B., GUEDES, L.E., Internet y pobreza. Montevideo: Editora Unesco - Ediciones Trilce. 

2004
  SORJ, B., A Democracia Inesperada: cidadania, direitos humanos e desigualdade social. Rio de Janeiro, Jorge Zahar. 
 
2003
 SORJ, B., brazil@digitaldivide.com. - Confronting inequality in the Information Society. UNESCO. 
 SORJ, B., brasil@povo.com - A Luta contra a Desigualdade na Sociedade da Informação. Rio de Janeiro, Jorge Zahar.

2001
 SORJ, B., BONDER, N., Judaísmo para o Século XXI: o rabino e o sociólogo. Rio de Janeiro, Jorge Zahar. Republished by The Edelstein Center for Social Research at 2010.
 SORJ, B., A Construção Intelectual do Brasil Contemporâneo. Da resistência à ditadura ao governo FHC. Rio de Janeiro, Jorge Zahar.

2000
  SORJ, B., A nova sociedade brasileira. Rio de Janeiro, Jorge Zahar (2nd. edition, 2001; 3rd edition, 2006).

1993
  SORJ, B., GRIN, M., (Ed.) Judaísmo e Modernidade: metamorfoses da tradição messiânica. Rio de Janeiro, Imago. Republished by The Edelstein Center for Social Research at 2008.

1990
  SORJ, B., PECAUT, D., (Ed.) Métamorphoses de la représentation politique au Brésil et en Europe, Editions du CNRS, Paris.
 SORJ, B., (Ed.) La Biotecnología Industrial en América Latina. Rio de Janeiro, Fundação BIORIO.
 SORJ, B., GOODMAN, D., WILKINSON, J., Da Lavoura às Biotecnologias: agricultura e indústria no sistema internacional. Rio de Janeiro, Campus. Republished by The Edelstein Center for Social Research at 2008.

1989
 SORJ, B., CANTLEY, M., SIMPSON, K., (Eds.) Biotechnology in Europe and Latin America: Prospects for co-operation, Kluwer, Dordrecht. Republished by The Edelstein Center for Social Research at 2010.

1987
  SORJ, B., GOODMAN, D., WILKINSON, J., From Farming to Biotechnology - A Theory of Agroindustrial Development. Oxford, Blackwell. 

1985
 SORJ, B., CARDOSO, F.H., FONT, M., (Ed.) Economia e Movimentos Sociais na América Latina. São Paulo, Brasiliense. Republished by The Edelstein Center for Social Research at 2008.

1983
 SORJ, B., BOOTH, D., (Ed.) Military Reformism and Social Classes: Aspects of the Peruvian Experience, 1968/1980, MacMillan, London.
 SORJ, B., TAVARES, M.H., (Ed.) Sociedade e Política no Brasil Pós-64. São Paulo, Brasiliense (3rd. Edition). Republished by The Edelstein Center for Social Research at 2008.

1982
 SORJ, B., POMPERMAYER, M., CORADINI, L., Camponeses e Agroindústria - Transformação Social e Representação Política na Avicultura Brasileira. Rio de Janeiro, Zahar. Republished by The Edelstein Center for Social Research at 2008.

1980
 SORJ, B., Estado e classes sociais na agricultura brasileira. Rio de Janeiro: Zahar (2nd Edition, 1986). Republished by The Edelstein Center for Social Research at 2008.

1977
 SORJ, B., HENFREY, C., Chilean Voices, London, Harverster Press. Republished by The Edelstein Center for Social Research at 2008.

References

External links
Bernardo Sorj Official website
The Edelstein Center for Social Research
 Bernardo Sorj's books at Unesco Database.

People from Montevideo
Naturalized citizens of Brazil
Academic staff of the Federal University of Rio de Janeiro
Brazilian sociologists
Uruguayan sociologists
1948 births
Living people
University of Haifa alumni
Academic staff of the Pontifical Catholic University of Rio de Janeiro